Edo Knol (born 13 July 1995) is a Dutch footballer who plays as a midfielder for Olympia Haarlem in the Derde Klasse.

Career
After failing to make his breakthrough into the ADO Den Haag first team, Knol moved to Telstar in the Eerste Divisie in  2014.

In April 2018, he signed with Rijnsburgse Boys in the Tweede Divisie and chose to focus on his studies next to his football career.

In March 2020, Knol joined Olympia Haarlem in order to gain more playing time.

References

External links
 

1995 births
Living people
People from Velsen
Footballers from North Holland
Dutch footballers
HFC Haarlem players
ADO Den Haag players
SC Telstar players
Rijnsburgse Boys players
Eerste Divisie players
Tweede Divisie players
Association football midfielders